Verhaeren is a surname. Notable people with the surname include:

Alfred Verhaeren (1849–1924), Belgian painter
Émile Verhaeren (1855–1916), Belgian poet and art critic
Jacco Verhaeren (born 1969), Dutch swimming coach and manager

See also
12697 Verhaeren, main-belt asteroid